Tajowal is a village in Shaheed Bhagat Singh Nagar district of Punjab State, India. The village is administrated by Sarpanch an elected representative of the village.

Demography 
As of 2011, Tajowal has a total number of 89 houses and population of 483 of which 246 include are males while 237 are females according to the report published by Census India in 2011. The literacy rate of Tajowal is 79.76% higher than the state average of 75.84%. The population of children under the age of 6 years is 63 which is 13.04% of total population of Tajowal, and child sex ratio is approximately 703 as compared to Punjab state average of 846.

Most of the people are from Schedule Caste which constitutes 68.74% of total population in Tajowal. The town does not have any Schedule Tribe population so far.

As per the report published by Census India in 2011, 176 people were engaged in work activities out of the total population of Tajowal which includes 120 males and 56 females. According to census survey report 2011, 38.07% workers describe their work as main work and 61.93% workers are involved in Marginal activity providing livelihood for less than 6 months.

Education 
The village has a Punjabi medium, co-ed primary school established in 1970. The school provide mid-day meal per Indian Midday Meal Scheme. As per Right of Children to Free and Compulsory Education Act the school provide free education to children between the ages of 6 and 14.

KC Engineering College and Doaba Khalsa Trust Group Of Institutions are the nearest colleges.

Transport 

See also 
List of villages in India

References

External links 
 Tourism of Punjab
 Census of Punjab
 Locality Based PINCode

Villages in Shaheed Bhagat Singh Nagar district